Tramm Hudson was a Republican candidate for Florida's 13th congressional district, to succeed former Congresswoman and U.S. Senate candidate Katherine Harris.

Background
Hudson was born in Montgomery, Alabama. He attended Vanderbilt University on a Reserve Officers' Training Corps (ROTC) scholarship, graduating in 1975. He served in the 3rd Infantry Division in Germany after graduating. He retired from the Army Reserve in 1996 with the rank of lieutenant colonel.

Hudson has had a long career as a banking executive and has served on a number of civic and business organizations in Florida. He has also been very active in Republican politics in the state, serving in the campaigns of Porter Goss and Jeb Bush, and was a Bush Pioneer in 2000 and 2004. He is a life member of the NRA

13th District Republican primary
Hudson ran in the Republican primary for U.S. Congress in 2006 but finished third losing to Vern Buchanan. Other candidates included former State Representatives Nancy C. Detert, Mark G. Flanagan and Donna Clarke.

Controversial racial remarks
Hudson was filmed making potentially racially insensitive comments about African-American troops formerly under his command at a Christian Coalition campaign event:

Hudson made a full and frank apology:

Family
Hudson married Sarah Love Thompson in 1984 and has three children.

References

Year of birth missing (living people)
Living people
Vanderbilt University alumni
Florida Republicans
United States Army officers
Politicians from Montgomery, Alabama
United States Army reservists